The Mitchell J. Green Plantation is a 19th-century plantation and was listed on the National Register of Historic Places in 1980.

Structures 
The listing for the Mitchell J. Green Plantation includes eight contributing buildings and five contributing structures. The plantation's main house is a two-story Plantation Plain house built in 1878.

The log cabin provided shelter for the Green family while they began to establish their plantation and, after several years of successful farming, they built the larger plantation house. Agricultural records and surviving agricultural buildings indicate that the Green family operated a rather self-sufficient plantation. The syrup house produced molasses for the plantation, while the smokehouse cured meat for the Green family. The commissary sold supplies to the tenant families.

Significance 
The Mitchell J. Green Plantation was deemed significant as a preserved example of a "typical post-Civil War plantation" in its nomination for National Register of Historic Places listing. Namely, the plantation's structures form an agricultural complex that is typical of the Southeast Georgia plantation after the Civil War. This is because the distribution of farm buildings on the Mitchell J. Green Plantation is different from the distribution on a pre-Civil War plantation, since this plantation's structures remain in such close proximity to each other. While it was not uncommon to build the necessary agricultural outbuildings near the plantation house, what distinguishes the Mitchell J. Green Plantation from other post-Civil War plantations is the relatively good condition of its structures.

References

Buildings and structures completed in 1868
Plantations in Georgia (U.S. state)
National Register of Historic Places in Evans County, Georgia
Plantation Plain architecture
Log cabins in the United States